Philippe Bidabe (born 13 January 1978 in Bayonne, France) is a French rugby union footballer. He currently plays for Biarritz Olympique in the Top 14 championship. His usual position is at wing but he can also play at centre. He made his Test debut for France in 2004 against Canada.

Awards 
 2 selections for France in 2004 and 2006.
 Heineken Cup runners up in 2010-11 with Biarritz in defeat against Stade Toulousain (21-19).
 Top 14 winner in 2003, 2005 and 2006.

External links
 ESPN profile
 

1978 births
French rugby union players
Living people
Biarritz Olympique players
France international rugby union players
Sportspeople from Bayonne
Rugby union centres
Rugby union wings